Jakob Anderegg (11 March 1829, in Oberwil im Simmental – 17 September 1878, in Meiringen) was a Swiss mountain guide and the first ascensionist of many prominent mountains in the western Alps during the golden and silver ages of alpinism.
Jakob Anderegg made the first ascent of the following peaks or routes:

 Balmhorn (Bernese Alps), 21 July 1864 with Frank, Lucy and Horace Walker, and Melchior Anderegg
 Piz Roseg (Bernina Range) with A. W. Moore and Horace Walker on 28 June 1865
 Ober Gabelhorn (Pennine Alps) with A. W. Moore and Horace Walker on 6 July 1865
 Pigne d'Arolla (Pennine Alps) with A. W. Moore and Melchior Anderegg on 9 July 1865
 Brenva Spur of Mont Blanc (Mont Blanc massif) with George Spencer Mathews, A. W. Moore, Frank and Horace Walker on 15 July 1865
 Gspaltenhorn (Bernese Alps) with G. E. Forster and Hans Baumann on 10 July 1869

Bibliography

External links 
 

Alpine guides
People from Interlaken-Oberhasli District
Swiss mountain climbers
1829 births

1878 deaths